Wiggonholt is a village in the Horsham District of West Sussex, England. The village consists of a farm, a few houses and a small Church of England parish church.

The RSPB Pulborough Brooks wildfowl reserve is north of the parish church, on the floodplain of the River Arun. Wiggonholt Common is an area of open woodland south of the village that adjoins Parham Park and is popular with walkers.

A Roman road, the Greensand Way, from north of Lewes passed north of the village to join Stane Street at Hardham on the west bank of the River Arun. The remains of a Roman bath house have been excavated beside the Roman road.

The small rectangular medieval parish church of unknown dedication has a bell turret and Horsham Stone roof, and has a Sussex marble font.

Notable residents 
John Broadwood (song collector), curate from 1832 to 1851.

Admiral Sir Reginald Hugh Spencer Bacon, KCB, KCVO, DSO (6 September 1863 – 9 June 1947)

References

Further reading

External links

Horsham District
Villages in West Sussex